Winthrop is a town in Kennebec County, Maine, United States. The population was 6,121 at the 2020 census. Winthrop's population, however, approximately doubles during the summer months as part-year residents return to seasonal camps located on the shores of Winthrop's Lakes and Ponds. A recreational area located among lakes, the town includes the villages of Winthrop and East Winthrop, and is the center of the Winthrop Lakes Region. Winthrop is included in the Augusta, Maine Micropolitan New England City and Town Area.

History

Winthrop was part of the Kennebec Purchase awarded by the Plymouth Council for New England. First called Pondtown for its lakes and ponds, it was settled by Timothy Foster in 1765. On April 26, 1771, Pondtown Plantation was incorporated by the Massachusetts General Court as Winthrop, named for the first colonial governor of Massachusetts, John Winthrop. Readfield was set off and incorporated in 1791. The surface of the town is uneven, but with good land that yielded hay, grain and apples. Winthrop became noted for its orchards and cattle.

At the outlet of Maranacook Lake into Annabessacook Lake, John Chandler built a sawmill in 1768, and then added a gristmill. Other industries followed, including a fulling mill, tannery and blacksmith shop. The Winthrop Woolen & Cotton Manufactory was incorporated in 1809, and in 1814 went into operation. By 1886, the town had a sawmill which manufactured about 200,000 feet of lumber every year, two oil cloth factories, a sash and blind factory, and a foundry and machine shop. The Maine Central Railroad opened to the village, carrying freight and tourists. Winthrop and its lakes developed into a summer resort, which it remains today.

Villages and neighborhoods
Winthrop has historically referred to its regions by directional names. Other than Winthrop Village and East Winthrop, their boundaries are not firmly established and tend to vary from person to person. Winthrop has several villages and areas that can be classified as neighborhoods. Some of them are:
Winthrop is the main, central area, often called The Village. It encompasses roughly the area around northern Annabessacook Lake to southern Marancook Lake. This is the central, downtown of Winthrop, featuring shops, eateries, businesses, a public beach and library. Just over 43% of Winthrop's population live in Winthrop Village.
North Area (Maranacook) loops around Maranacook Lake, and includes the popular Memorial Drive, often referred to as The Drive. The area features excellent public landings, and is heavily developed with many summer homes, year-round residences, and rental cabins.
East Winthrop is located just west of Manchester and south of Readfield, borders most of Cobbosseecontee Lake, and all of Little Cobbosseecontee, Upper & Lower Narrows. It has a separate post office and ZIP code (04343) from the rest of Winthrop (04364), although this serves only mail delivered to post office boxes in the East Winthrop Post Office. The area has magnificent views of the Cobbosseecontee bodies of water.
South Area (Annabessacook) borders Monmouth and loops around Annabessacook Lake. The area includes popular lakeside tourist attractions, including the 65 acre Augusta West Resort, and the 25 acre historic Annabessacook Farm Bed & Breakfast.
West Area (Mt. Pisgah area) encompasses roughly the area from Wilson Pond up to Berry Pond. The southern part of this area is home to Mount Pisgah. This is a popular fishing area, as Wilson Pond abounds with natural populations of warm-water species, especially bass and perch.

Geography

Winthrop is an industrial and suburban center, located about 10 miles west of Maine's capital city, Augusta. Nearly 10% of Winthrop's housing is seasonal. The commercial downtown is situated between Maranacook and Annabessacook Lake.

Winthrop is drained by Hoyt Brook.

The town is crossed by U. S. Route 202 and state routes 11, 41, 100, 133 and 135. It is bordered by the towns of Manchester to the east, West Gardiner to the southeast, Monmouth to the south, Leeds and Wayne to the west, and Readfield to the north.

Winthrop is also home to Mt. Pisgah (pronounced piss-gah, from the Hebrew word for summit or lookout), which is 807 ft above sea level and home to the Maine Fire Services watch tower that was in service from 1949 to 1992, when air patrols rendered it obsolete. The tower still stands to this day and is accessible by a hiking trail.

Demographics

As of 2000 the median income for a household in the town was $58,066, and the median income for a family was $64,637. Males had a median income of $35,262 versus $27,130 for females. The per capita income for the town was $27,755.  9.2% of the population and 5.0% of families were below the poverty line.  Out of the total population, 13.8% of those under the age of 18 and 17.8% of those 65 and older were living below the poverty line.

Winthrop has historically been known as a fast-growing suburban town, and saw its population triple during the 20th century. Its growth rate has slowed in recent years, and saw a decline in the 2010 census for the first time in almost a century. Winthrop has always been the largest in population municipality in Kennebec County that was classified as a town and not a city. Oakland surpassed Winthrop's population in the 2010 census.

2010 census
As of the census of 2010, there were 6,092 people, 2,598 households, and 1,740 families residing in the town. The racial makeup of the town was 97.6% White, 0.3% Black or African American, 0.2% Native American, 0.3% Asian, and 1.4% from two or more races.  1.0% of the population were Hispanic or Latino of any race.

There were 2,598 households, of which 28.2% had children under the age of 18 living with them, 52.3% were married couples living together, 10.1% had a female householder with no husband present, and 33% were non-families. 26.9% of all households were made up of individuals, and 9.5% had someone living alone who was 65 years of age or older.  The average household size was 2.31 and the average family size was 2.76.

In the town, the population was spread out, with 22.3% under the age of 20, 9% from 20 to 29, 17.1% from 30 to 44, 34.2% from 45 to 64, and 17.1% who were 65 years of age or older.  The median age was 46 years.  The female population was 51.6% and male population 48.4%.

Education

Winthrop Public Schools is an independent school district serving approximately 840 students in grades Pre-K–12. Winthrop's schools are governed by the Winthrop School Committee. The five-member group consists of elected representatives from Winthrop. The members serve two-year terms and conduct monthly meetings that are open to the public.
Winthrop operates 3 schools:
Winthrop Grade School (Pre-K–5) 395 students
Winthrop Middle School (6–8) 205 students
Winthrop High School (9–12) 242 students

Winthrop is also home to the Monmouth/Winthrop Adult Education.

Government

Local government
Winthrop uses the Council-Manager form of government, in which the Town Council is the primary governing authority. The Winthrop Town Council consists of seven elected members. The Town Council appoints and confirms both the Town Manager, and the Town Attorney. The Town Manager, in turn, appoints the Finance Director, and Clerk. In addition to these positions, Winthrop has several departments used to provide the services necessary to the town.

The framework for the town government is defined in the Municipal charter.

Political makeup

Winthrop is known as being politically moderate, and consistently votes for both liberals and conservatives for local, state, and national offices. In the 2008 Presidential election, Barack Obama received 2,006 of the town's votes to John McCain's 1,569, and in the 2004 Presidential election, John Kerry received 50% of the town's votes to George W. Bush's 47.4%, compared to 53% for Kerry and 45% for Bush statewide. In 2009 the town voted in favor of a statewide referendum to overturn a state law allowing same-sex marriage in Maine by a vote of 2,349 to 1,277, but voted in 2012 on a referendum to allow same-sex marriage 53% to 47%.
The town has more Independent voters than it does Democrats or Republicans:

Sites of interest
 Camp Mechuwana is a United Methodist camp that was established in 1948 and is located on 230 acres of forest land. The camp borders Lake Annabessacook and Lower Narrows Pond.
 The Charles M. Bailey Public Library serves Winthrop and surrounding communities. It was founded in 1916 and is located on Bowdoin Street. The library holds various cultural events such as lectures, film series, and music.
 Cobbossee Lighthouse, only active inland waters lighthouse in Maine
 Moses Bailey House
 Mt. Pisgah, the highest point in Kennebec County, with a hiking trail leading to a historic fire lookout tower and (on a clear day), a view of Mount Washington in New Hampshire.

Winthrop Lakes Region

Winthrop is at the center of the Winthrop Lakes Region, which is situated between Lewiston and Augusta, Maine, and centered around six major bodies of water: Androscoggin Lake, Annabessacook Lake, Cobbosseecontee Lake, Echo Lake, Maranacook Lake and Parker Pond, in addition to numerous smaller bodies of water. Besides Winthrop, the region includes the towns of Fayette, Readfield, and Mount Vernon to the north, Manchester to the east, Monmouth to the south, and Wayne to the west. The northern part of Mount Vernon is considered to be part of the Belgrade Lakes Region. The region is a popular recreation area in central Maine, with over three dozen Lakes and ponds offering a variety of boating, hiking, cycling, camping and fishing opportunities. The area is also home to numerous shoreline events, concerts and festivals.

The Winthrop Lakes Region includes the following bodies of water: 

*Cobbosseecontee Lake (known locally as Cobbossee) is nationally recognized as one of the top bass-fishing lakes in America due to its impressive largemouth population. Cobbossee also has the only active inland waters lighthouse in Maine, Ladies Delight Light.

Notable people 

 John T. Averill, US congressman
 Hannah Johnston Bailey, peace/temperance/suffrage activist
 Samuel P. Benson, US congressman
 Del Bissonette, MLB first baseman and coach
 Thomas Fillebrown, head of the American Dental Association
 Patrick Flood, Maine state legislator
 Olga Fonda, film and television actress and model
 Henry H. Goddard, psychologist and eugenicist
 Craig Hickman, writer, farmer and state legislator
 Ezekiel Holmes, agriculturalist and politician
 Elizabeth Armstrong Reed, scholar/author
 Ben Roy, comedian and musician
 Jerrold Speers, politician and lawyer
 Barbara Walsh, Pulitzer Prize–winning journalist
 Benjamin White, US congressman
 George F. Wilson, MLB catcher
 Henry Clay Wood, U.S. Army officer who received the Medal of Honor during the American Civil War

References

External links

 Town of Winthrop, Maine
 Bailey Public Library
 Maranacook Lake Association
 Winthrop Chamber of Commerce

 
Towns in Kennebec County, Maine